Christian Today is a non-denominational Christian news company with its international headquarters in London, England.

History 
The website was established in 2000 to report on news in the global church and current affairs from a Christian perspective. A Braille version under the title of the Christian Today Digest is produced for the blind in partnership with Torch Trust.

The newspaper was awarded Best Christian News and Reviews Site in 2007 and 2008 at the Premier Christian's Blog and Web Awards held in London, UK.

In addition to providing regular news updates to the Christian community, Christian Today has provided press and IT support to Christian initiatives and organizations, including Micah Challenge UK, the Global Day of Prayer, and the World Evangelical Alliance.

The publication regularly contributes as a media commentator and analyst on local, national, and international levels, including BBC Television, BBC Radio, Channel 4, and Sky News.

Christian Today is edited by Xia-Maria Mackay.

References

External links 
 

British news websites
Religious newspapers published in the United Kingdom
Newspapers established in 2000
Christian mass media companies
Christian websites
2000 establishments in England
Newspapers published in London